The Colorado State Board of Education is a government body in the U.S. state of Colorado tasked with general supervision of public schools. The Constitution of Colorado was amended in 1948 to authorize an elected State Board of Education and the first elections took place in November 1950. The board is composed of members elected from districts corresponding to Colorado's congressional districts. During periods when Colorado is allocated an even number of congressional seats, an additional member is elected by statewide vote, thereby leading to an odd number of members and reducing the potential for tied votes. Following the 2020 census, there are eight districts and therefore nine members.

Members

Elected in partisan elections, board members serve staggered six-year terms. Districts 5, 6, and the at large seat hold elections in years divisible by six, followed two years later by Districts 2, 4, and 8, and two years later by Districts 1, 3, and 7.

Notes

References

External links
 Colorado State Board of Education website

State agencies of Colorado
Public education in Colorado
Colorado